Deh-e Gerduiyeh (also Romanized as Deh-e Gerdū’īyeh; also known as Deh-e Gazhdū and Deh Gerdū) is a village in Sarduiyeh Rural District, Sarduiyeh District, Jiroft County, Kerman Province, Iran. At the 2006 census, its population was 140, in 27 families.

References 

Populated places in Jiroft County